Primo Mori (San Miniato, 7 April 1944) was an Italian professional road bicycle racer.

Major results

1969
1969 Giro d'Italia:
8th place overall classification
1970
Tour de France:
Winner stage 13

External links 

Official Tour de France results for Primo Mori

1944 births
Living people
People from San Miniato
Italian male cyclists
Italian Tour de France stage winners
Sportspeople from the Province of Pisa
Cyclists from Tuscany